NIILM School of Business or NSB was a Business School in New Delhi and Kolkata, India.

It produces the NSB Management Review (NMR), a half-yearly journal which publishes theoretical and empirical research papers and articles of relevance to both academicians and practitioners.

The programmes it offers include the PGPBM (Post-Graduate Program in Business Management), MBA and Diplomas in French and German Language. It also offers IMPRESS — Life Skills & Employability Training Program which offers business skills such as team building, leadership, etc.

It also hosts a variety of forums, including NICME (NSB International Center for Management Excellence) and SCOPE (Social Contribution of Professional in Education)

Ranking
Rated  A+ in Business India Best B-School Survey for 3 Consecutive years (2009, 2008 & 2007)
Ranked as 40th Best B-School in India by Competition Success Review - GHRDC Survey 2009
Rated A+++ Best B-School by Just Careers Magazine 2009 & 2008
Rated One of the Top Notch B-School in India by Dalal Street 2010 & 2009

Business schools in Delhi
Business schools in Kolkata
Educational institutions established in 2003
2003 establishments in India